K Chandrushekar Avinash (born 23 June 1987) is an Indian cricketer who plays for Karnataka cricket team as well as Mangalore United. He is right-hand wicket-keeper batsman.

References

External links
 
 

1987 births
Living people
Indian cricketers
Karnataka cricketers
Cricketers from Bangalore
Wicket-keepers